Bromothymol blue (also known as bromothymol sulfone phthalein and BTB) is a pH indicator. It is mostly used in applications that require measuring substances that would have a relatively neutral pH (near 7). A common use is for measuring the presence of carbonic acid in a liquid. It is typically sold in solid form as the sodium salt of the acid indicator.

Structure and properties

Bromothymol blue acts as a weak acid in a solution. It can thus be in protonated or deprotonated form, appearing yellow or blue, respectively. It is bright aquamarine by itself, and greenish-blue in a neutral solution. The deprotonation of the neutral form results in a highly conjugated structure, accounting for the difference in color. An intermediate of the deprotonation mechanism is responsible for the greenish color in neutral solution.

The protonated form of bromothymol blue has its peak absorption at 427 nm thus transmitting yellow light in acidic solutions, and the deprotonated form has its peak absorption at 602 nm thus transmitting blue light in more basic solutions. Highly acidic Bromothymol blue is magenta in color.

The general carbon skeleton of bromothymol blue is common to many indicators including chlorophenol red, thymol blue, and bromocresol green.

The presence of one moderate electron-withdrawing group (bromine atom) and two moderate donating groups (alkyl substituents) are responsible for bromothymol blue's active indication range from a pH of 6.0 to 7.6. While the conjugation is responsible for the length and nature of the color change range, these substituent groups are ultimately responsible for the indicator's active range.

Bromothymol blue is sparingly soluble in oil, but soluble in water, ether, and aqueous solutions of alkalis. It is less soluble in nonpolar solvents such as benzene, toluene, and xylene, and practically insoluble in petroleum ether.

Synthesis and preparation
Bromothymol blue is synthesized by addition of elemental bromine to thymol blue in a solution in glacial acetic acid.

To prepare a solution for use as pH indicator, dissolve 0.10 g in 8.0 cm3 N/50 (a.k.a. 0.02 Normal) NaOH and dilute with water to 250 cm3. To prepare a solution for use as indicator in volumetric work, dissolve 0.1 g in 100 cm3 of 50% (v/v) ethanol.

Uses

Bromothymol blue may be used for observing photosynthetic activities, or as a respiratory indicator (turns yellow as CO2 is added). A common demonstration of BTB's pH indicator properties involves exhaling through a tube into a neutral solution of BTB.  As CO2 is absorbed from the breath into the solution, forming carbonic acid, the solution changes color from green to yellow. Thus, BTB is commonly used in science classes to demonstrate that the more that muscles are used, the greater the CO2 output.

Bromothymol blue has been used in conjunction with phenol red to monitor the fungal asparaginase enzyme activity with phenol red turning pink and bromothymol blue turning blue indicating an increase in pH and therefore enzyme activity. However, a recent study suggests that methyl red is more useful in determining activity due to the bright yellow ring formed in the zone of enzyme activity.

It may also be used in the laboratory as a biological slide stain. At this point, the bromothymol is already blue, and a few drops of BTB are used on a water slide. The specimen is mixed with blue BTB solution and fixed to a slide by a cover slip. It is sometimes used to define cell walls or nuclei under the microscope.

Bromothymol is used in obstetrics for detecting premature rupture of membranes. Amniotic fluid typically has a pH > 7.2, bromothymol will therefore turn blue when brought in contact with fluid leaking from the amnion. As vaginal pH normally is acidic, the blue color indicates the presence of amniotic fluid. The test may be false-positive in the presence of other alkaline substances such as blood or semen, or in the presence of bacterial vaginosis.

See also
pH indicator
Litmus
Phenolphthalein
Methyl orange
Universal indicator

References

External links 
J.T.Baker MSDS
Bromothymol Blue (Sodium Salt) -Sigma Aldrich

PH indicators
Triarylmethane dyes
Microbiological media ingredients
Benzoxathioles
Phenol dyes
Bromoarenes
Isopropyl compounds